Jonas Jonsson may refer to:

Jonas Jonsson (19th-century builder) (1806—1885), Swedish master builder
Jonas Jonsson (footballer) (born 1975), retired Swedish footballer
Jonas Jonsson (sailor) (1873–1926), Swedish sailor 
Jonas Jonsson (singer), Swedish pop singer/songwriter
Jonas Jonsson (sport shooter) (1903–1996), Swedish sport shooter
Jónas Jónsson, Icelandic politician and educator